On the Open Road is a 1992 play by Steve Tesich.  

It is a post-apocalyptic tale concerning the events after a "civil war" within the United States. Characters drag wheeled carts filled with meager possessions through a destroyed American wasteland. There have been numerous productions throughout the US.

Plays by Steve Tesich
Plays set in the United States
Post-apocalyptic fiction
1992 plays